The Russian State Ballet of Siberia, is a classical ballet company based at the Krasnoyarsk State Opera and Ballet Theatre, in Krasnoyarsk, Russia.  Founded in 1978 by graduates of the choreographic schools of Moscow, St. Petersburg, Kiev, Novosibirsk and Yekaterinburg.

Repertoire
The Russian State Ballet of Siberia toured the UK in 2007, 2008, 2009, 2012, 2013, 2016, 2017 and 2020. Their repertoire included Coppélia, The Nutcracker, Swan Lake, The Sleeping Beauty, Romeo and Juliet, Cinderella and Giselle.

References

Ballet companies in Russia
Performing groups established in 1978